Brigitte Lindholm  is a fictional player character who appears in the 2016 video game Overwatch—a first-person shooter developed by Blizzard Entertainment—and related animations and literary media. Although Overwatch was released in 2016, Brigitte was introduced as a playable support character in a March 2018 update for the game. Prior to her video game debut, she first appeared in Dragon Slayer, an issue of the Overwatch digital comic series.

Development and design
Brigitte as a character had already been introduced within the lore of Overwatch as Torbjörn's daughter and friend to Reinhardt, through the Dragon Slayer digital comic released in 2016. Brigitte was developed alongside the character of Moira, who was the game's 26th hero. Originally named Pally, Blizzard had originally given her an ability to send out a healing orb to other teammates which had a long cooldown time. As they fleshed out both characters, they opted to push the tank-hybrid more for Pally, and transferred the healing orb to Moira, which would become part of her Biotic Orb abilities. As they worked more on Pally's character, they recognized her skill set integrated well with Brigitte's own story, and thus established the hero to the established lore.

Overwatchs developers designed Brigitte as a support–tank hybrid intended to counter the "dive" strategy that was dominating the current Overwatch metagame. With the dive strategy, a team would have a mobile character (such as Winston or Tracer) race into the back lines of a defending team while the defenders main tanks were elsewhere and unable to protect the weaker characters. This would be a sacrificial move by attacking teams, using the disruption to deal with the other remaining team. With Brigitte on defense, she would be able to stun and delay the diving character long enough to allow the defending team to react and close ranks, nullifying the dive strategy. Jeff Kaplan called the character, prior to her formal reveal, as "very needed" in the game.

In late February 2018, Brigitte was officially announced to be the 27th playable character in Overwatch. In a developer update video introducing Brigitte, Overwatch developer Jeff Kaplan described Brigitte's gameplay abilities, detailing her design as a support–tank hybrid. Brigitte's "hybrid" description stems from the game incorporating both abilities seen in the tank role—like a barrier shield—as well as healing abilities in her skill set. Although referring to Brigitte as a "hybrid" character, Kaplan maintained that she is a primarily support character.

The character spent a few weeks playable only on Blizzard's "Public Test Realm" (PTR) server, before she was made fully available to players on March 20. After Brigitte was initially made available on Blizzard's PTR server, PCGamesN noted her ability to disrupt "dive comp", a team composition featuring tank character Winston and offense character Tracer. The outlet explained dive comps are "defined by mobile characters able to pounce on key enemy characters - typically their supports - before they can react, then mopping up the rest of the team once an advantage has been won." PCGamesN connected Brigitte's ability to disrupt this aspect of the game's meta to Kaplan's statements about how she would "shake up the meta."

Gameplay
Brigitte is classified as a support character and is listed as a one-star (low) difficulty character for players. Although she is listed as a support character, Blizzard developed her as a support–tank hybrid, as she both carries a barrier shield and is able to heal teammates.

Video game outlets GameSpot, USgamer, and Engadget described Brigitte's move set as an apt blending of Torbjörn and Reinhardt's abilities. Her move set includes her Rocket Flail melee attack, which has an extended range and allows her to strike multiple enemies in one swing. Brigitte's flail is also augmented with the Whip Shot ability, allowing her to throw her flail a long distance, dealing damage and knocking an enemy back in the process. Her Inspire ability allows her to passively heal nearby teammates over time when she hits enemies with her flail. Brigitte can also actively heal allies with her Repair Pack ability; as of the latest patch, Repair pack no longer gives teammates armor if it over heals them. Brigitte additionally comes equipped with a Barrier Shield, which is a "frontal energy barrier that can absorb a limited amount of damage," while also protecting allies behind it. While the shield is activated, players can use Brigitte's Shield Bash ability to dash forward, stunning an enemy hit by the dash. Brigitte's "Ultimate ability" is Rally, which allows her to move faster and provide all nearby allies with a temporary armor.

Matilda Smedius provides the voice for Brigitte.

Fictional character biography
Brigitte's character backstory is tied into that of her father Torbjörn's and her godfather Reinhardt's. Outside of the game, Blizzard's fictional biography for Brigitte lists her full real name as Brigitte Lindholm, her age as 23, and her former base of operations as Gothenburg, Sweden.

In-universe, Brigitte is an adventurer and a mechanical engineer, following in the footsteps of her father, Torbjörn. Torbjörn, in Overwatch's lore, is the Chief Engineer for the Overwatch organization. One teaser for the Brigitte's character reveal described Reinhardt saving Torbjörn, after the latter gets severely injured on "Operation: White Dome", an Overwatch mission. In a letter to his pregnant wife, Torbjörn expresses that he will be allowing Reinhardt to name his daughter as a thankful gesture. After the dissolution of the Overwatch organization, Reinhardt chose to continue to fight for justice as a knight-errant. Brigitte requested to join him as his squire, and Reinhardt accepted and would train her in combat. Her responsibilities initially included maintaining Reinhardt's armor, but she increasingly began to have to heal Reinhardt's wounds. Brigitte began to believe her role was insufficient, and developed her own armor in secret to fight alongside Reinhardt. Brigitte also designed Reinhardt's shield.

Appearances

Video games
Brigitte made her video game debut in March 2018, when she was introduced into Overwatchs playable Hero roster.

Animations
Brigitte appeared in the November 2017 animated short, Honor and Glory, which centered around the character Reinhardt.

Coinciding with the announcement of Brigitte being included in Overwatchs playable character roster, Blizzard released a short animated origin story about her, focusing on her relationships with Torbjörn and Reinhardt.

Comics
Brigitte made her first official appearance in any form of media in Dragon Slayer, the second issue of Overwatchs digital comic series. Dragon Slayer, released in April 2016, features Brigitte throughout, but focuses on Reinhardt defeating local thugs. She later appeared in the December 2016 issue Reflections in a panel featuring her family and Reinhardt.

Reception
Brigitte's reveal led to Stewart Chisam—a game developer on Hi-Rez Studios' Paladins—posting a tweet, comparing Brigitte to Ash, a character from Paladins. When reached for comment by Kotaku, Chisam expressed that the tweet was a light-hearted joke and an "a bit of an homage to tons of Overwatch Clone comments Paladins received when it first came to market."

While Brigitte was added to Overwatch on March 20, 2018, she was not added to the servers for the 2018 Overwatch League season until the start of Stage 4, commencing in May 2018. To that point, many teams in the League had excelled on the dive composition, particularly the New York Excelsior, which had nearly secured their spot in the season finals. With Brigitte was added, other teams adapted her into their team compositions and were able to effectively counter the Excelsior's dive strategies, while Excelsior had not adapted to Brigitte's abilities during season play. Though Excelsior still was the League's top seed leading into the finals, they lost their semi-final round to the Philadelphia Fusion, in part because the Fusion had used Brigitte in their compositions to challenge Excelsior's dive approach.

In the months following her release, innumerable high-profile players complained that Brigitte was too powerful given her kit of crowd-control abilities, being able to hit multiple targets with her main attack and being able to stun with her shield bash. Some players argued to the point that Blizzard should remove the character from the game, creating a viral call out to "Delete Brig". In particular, Brigitte became a central support character in the popular "GOATS" team composition (named after the Overwatch Contenders team that popularized it) that includes three tanks and three support which had proven extremely difficult to counter; Brigitte's role in the GOATS, outside of healing, was to use her shield bash to break enemy character's shields. Blizzard had recognized the problems with Brigitte in the current metagame involving GOATS, but had no immediate plans to remove her from the game. Instead, they continued to work on various buffs and debuffs to make Brigitte less overpowering, in particular, removing the ability to stun characters through shields. With the start of the 2019 Overwatch League season, the GOATS composition was heavily used by many team, drawing negative audience reactions as such games tended to be viewed as unexciting. Some people on social media continued to blame the character of Brigitte for the lackluster league games, and in some cases, started harassing her voice actress, Matilda Smedius. Many more fans stood behind Smedius against the harassment, with Smedius appreciative of their support.

In July 2019, Blizzard introduced a role queue feature that limited teams to a composition with two of each of the three classes in competitive and most other game modes, which made a GOATS composition impossible, though Blizzard stated that this change was not aimed to deal with any specific team composition. Along with this feature came a character rework for Brigitte aimed at making her viable within the new default ruleset of the game, eliminating or ameliorating most common complaints usually brought up by players. Blizzard released a limited-available Brigitte cosmetic skin at the start of the 2020 Overwatch League season called "GOAT Brigitte" (GOAT for Greatest of All Time) but cheekily alluding to the GOATS team composition.

References

Comics characters introduced in 2016
Female characters in animation
Female characters in comics
Female characters in video games
Fictional characters with healing abilities
Fictional female engineers
Fictional female knights
Fictional female mechanics
Fictional knights in video games
Fictional shield fighters
Fictional Swedish people
Overwatch characters
Video game characters introduced in 2018
Woman soldier and warrior characters in video games